Redland is an unincorporated town and census-designated place (CDP) in Angelina County, Texas, United States. The population was 1,047 at the 2010 census. This was a new CDP for the 2010 census.

Geography
U.S. Route 59, a four-lane highway, runs through the CDP, leading south to Lufkin and north  to Nacogdoches.

References

External links

Census-designated places in Angelina County, Texas
Census-designated places in Texas